Lekrings is a Men's Highest Floorball League of Latvia team based in Cēsis, Latvia. Lekrings became champions of the first and the next two seasons of Latvian championships. Title was won again in 2008/09, 2012/13, 2013/14 and 2014/15 seasons.

Current roster

1 Markuss Plūdums
6 Emīls Dzalbs
7 Bruno Beķeris
8 Toms Rīsmanis
10  Edgars Purinš
13 Jānis Melderis
15  Krišjānis Tiltiņš
17  Jorens Malkavs
23  Andris Rajeckis
27  Pauls Erenbots
29  Ričards Stivriņš
30  Kārlis Grintāls
34  Roberts Zande
37  Krišs Treimanis
41  Artūrs Jurševskis
47  Artūrs Lazdiņš
69  Miķelis Koknesis Roops
72  Olafs Zvīnis
81  Kaspars Lisovskis
89  Kristiānas Miezītis

Transferred / Not Active  Players

 1  Guntis Bundzenieks
 7  Mārtiņš Jarohovičs
 9  Ivars Rancāns
14  Engus Bulmeisters
15  Jānis Freivalds
16  Jānis Platacis
17  Artis Malkavs
19  Jānis Belasovs
20  Kaspars Freibergs
21  Mārtiņš Druvkalns
22  Aigars Belasovs
23  Jānis Alps
96  Ervīns Apinis

External links
Official website

Cēsis
Floorball in Latvia
Latvian floorball teams